Miftah Uddin Ahmed is a Bangladesh Army Lieutenant Colonel and officer of Rapid Action Battalion who has been sanctioned by the United States for human rights violations.

Career 
Commanding Officer Ahmed oversaw the arrest of the owner, Abu Bakar Siddique, of M.V. Pinak a ferry that sank in Padma River killing 48, after the owner went into hiding. Siddique had been charged with culpable homicide for overloading his ferry that lead to its sinking.

Commanding officer of Rapid Action Battalion-7, Ahmed, led a raid on a farm in Chittagong and recovered significant amount of firearms and detained five in 2015. His team raided a residence in Chittagong and detained four people with bombs February 2015.

In 2017, Ahmed as commanding officer of Rapid Action Battalion-7 led a crackdown on Shaheed Hamza Brigade, an Islamist militant group. It arrested businessman Enamul Haque who allegedly provided funding to the group.

On 18 April 2016, two robbers were killed in a gunfight with Rapid Action Battalion-7, which Ahmed commanded, in Mirsarai upazila. In July, his team detained Mozaher Hossain Mia, who supplied weapons to the militants involved with July 2016 Dhaka attack. His unit recovered more drugs from Chittagong that year in cartons of light bulbs. In October 2016, three other robbers died in a shootout with Ahmed's unit.

Ahmed, Commanding officer (CO) of Rapid Action Battalion-7, announced the confiscation of 1.5 million Ya ba tablet and arrest of five Myanmar citizen on 25 June 2017.

In January 2018, Ahmed was awarded for bravery in service by the government of Bangladesh. Ahmed was serving as Commanding officer of Rapid Action Battalion-7 when Ekramul Haque, a councilor of Tekhnaf Municipality, was killed in a shootout with RAB on 27 May 2018. Ahmed called Ekramul a "top godfather of Yaba’ trading" after his death and alleged they were many cases against him.

U.S. sanctions 
On 10 December 2021, the U.S. Department of the Treasury placed Ahmed on its Specially Designated Nationals (SDN) list for engaging in serious human rights abuses relating to his tenure at Rapid Action Battalion, including the Killing of Ekramul Haque. Inspector General of Bangladesh Police, Benazir Ahmed, was also one of the five individuals sanctioned including Miftah.

References 

Living people
Bangladesh Army colonels
Rapid Action Battalion officers
Specially Designated Nationals and Blocked Persons List
Year of birth missing (living people)